Shanzhou or Shan Prefecture was a zhou (prefecture) in imperial China, centering on modern Shan County, Henan, China. It was created in 487 by the Northern Wei and existed (intermittently) until 1913 after the establishment of the Republic.

See also
 Shaanxi, a modern Chinese province

References
 

Prefectures of the Sui dynasty
Prefectures of the Tang dynasty
Prefectures of Later Tang
Prefectures of Later Han (Five Dynasties)
Prefectures of Later Liang (Five Dynasties)
Prefectures of Later Jin (Five Dynasties)
Prefectures of Later Zhou
Prefectures of the Jin dynasty (1115–1234)
Prefectures of the Song dynasty
Prefectures of the Yuan dynasty
Prefectures of the Ming dynasty
Prefectures of the Qing dynasty
Former prefectures in Henan
Former prefectures in Shanxi